The Penitent is a 1988 American-Mexican film and the directorial debut of Cliff Osmond.  It stars Raul Julia and Armand Assante.

Plot
In a small, deeply religious New Mexican town where annually the crucifixion of Jesus is literally reenacted, a love triangle with tragic results develops between a troubled young wife Celia Guerola (Rona Freed), her husband Ramón Guerola (Raul Julia) and his handsome best friend Juan Mateo (Armand Assante).

Cast
 Raul Julia as Ramon Guerola
 Armand Assante as Juan Mateo
 Rona Freed (Rona de Ricci) as Celia Guerola
 Julie Carmen as Corina
 Lucy Reina as Margarita
 Eduardo Lopez Rojas as The Mayor
 Juana Molinero as Ramon's Mother
 Martin LaSalle as Miguel
 Tina Romero as Susana
 Demián Bichir as Roberto

References

External links
 
 

1988 films
American drama films
Mexican drama films
Films about Mexican Americans
Films scored by Alex North
1988 directorial debut films
Crucifixion of Jesus in art
1980s English-language films
1980s American films
1980s Mexican films